Robonauts is a 2D arcade-like shooting game developed and published by QubicGames. It was released on Nintendo Switch on 15 September 2017 in North America and Europe and in Japan on 21 June 2018, and PlayStation 4 on 19 September 2017.

Gameplay 
The player/s takes on the role of a Robonaut, a 'Robot Astronaut" who travels around planets shooting enemies. A gateway is present at every level, which if used will send players to the next level. However, the gateway is only accessible if all enemies are defeated. The player/s have the option to shoot with either primary or secondary weapons.

The game has multiple features which are unique to this game:

Gravity switching 
The feature allows players to switch to other planets that are directly on top of, under. or next to players.

Tactical mode 
This feature pauses the game and shows a map of the current level. It also highlights remaining enemies, which can be useful if one wants to open access to a gateway.

Game modes 
Besides the single-player campaign, there is also a co-op feature and a Vs. Game mode.

All multiplayer modes are local-only and the game does not support online play.

Soundtrack 
The soundtrack was composed by Simon Viklund. It features arcade music with robotic beats.

Reception 

The game was rated 69% at GameRankings. Nintendo Life gave the game 7/10, justifying their score by mentioning while the game could be quite repetitive, it was "well-crafted". COG said that "Robonauts is a game that knows precisely what it is: a classic arcade-inspired shooter with unique mechanics to keep it fresh", while saying it "should have been better", giving it a score of 68/100.

Sales 
Robonauts sold more than 320,000 times on both platforms Nintendo Switch and PlayStation 4.

External links 
Official profile at nintendo.com

References

Shooter video games
Side-scrolling platform games
Nintendo Switch games
PlayStation 4 games
2017 video games
Video games about robots
Science fiction video games
English-language-only video games
Cooperative video games
Multiplayer and single-player video games
Video games developed in Poland
Video games scored by Simon Viklund
QubicGames games